Monte Vista (Spanish for "View Mountain") is an unincorporated community in Placer County, California. It lies at an elevation of 3327 feet (1014 m).

References

Unincorporated communities in California
Unincorporated communities in Placer County, California